Chandler is an unincorporated community in Clay County, in northwest Missouri. The community is on the Burlington Northern Railroad Line between Liberty and Kearney. Holmes Creek flows past the community.

History
A post office called Chandler was established in 1885, and remained in operation until 1947. The community was named after John N. Chandler, an officer in the Civil War.

References

Unincorporated communities in Clay County, Missouri
Unincorporated communities in Missouri